CaixaForum Barcelona is a cultural center in Barcelona, Catalonia, Spain. Located in the Montjuïc area in a former Modernist textile factory designed by Josep Puig i Cadafalch, it is owned by the not-for-profit banking foundation "la Caixa". After a restoration of the building, the art center opened its doors in 2002 and since then it hosts temporary art exhibitions and cultural events.

The building
The building was originally commissioned as a textile factory by Casimir Casaramona i Puigcercós, and built by the famous Catalan Modernism architect Josep Puig i Cadafalch.
Called the "Casaramona factory", it was completed in 1911, and the same year won the City Council's award for best industrial building. The factory closed in 1919, but reopened as a warehouse for the 1929 Barcelona International Exposition.

In 1940, the building was used as a cavalry barracks for the Spanish Armed Police Corps, and it was used as such until "la Caixa" banking foundation bought it in 1963. It was opened as a cultural center in February 2002. The building was restored prior to its opening, and a new entrance was built, designed by Japanese architect Arata Isozaki, in a process that included firing 100,000 bricks to match the original ones.

The center, has almost three acres of exhibition space, a media library, auditorium, classrooms and a restaurant. Visitors descend by escalator to the basement lobby, adorned by a Sol LeWitt mural, then rise again to the exhibition spaces on the ground floor, within the crenelated brickwork.

Gallery

See also
 CosmoCaixa Barcelona
 CaixaForum Madrid
 CaixaForum Lleida

References

Art museums and galleries in Catalonia
Museums in Barcelona
La Caixa